Reino is the Portuguese, Galician and Spanish word for kingdom and may refer to:

 Reino, Campania, a town in the province of Benevento, Italy

People

Surname
Reino is a Spanish surname. Notable people with this surname include:
 Fernando Gómez-Reino (born 1955), Spanish swimmer
 Helen Reino, maiden name of Helen Klaos (born 1983), Estonian badminton player

Given name
Reino is a Finnish male given name. Notable people with this name include:
 Reino Aarnio (1912–1988), American architect
 Reino Börjesson (born 1929), Swedish football player
 Reino Gikman (allegedly born 1930), alias used by an undercover agent for the Soviet KGB
 Reino Hallamaa (1899–1979), Finnish colonel
 Reino Helismaa (1913–1965), Finnish singer-songwriter
 Reino Häyhänen (1920–1961), Soviet intelligence officer of the KGB
 Reino Kangasmäki (1916–2010), Finnish journalist and Greco-Roman wrestler
 Reino Kuivamäki (1918–1982), Finnish athlete
 Reino Kuuskoski (1907–1965), Finnish jurist
 Reino Nordin (born 1983), Finnish actor and musician
 Reino Oittinen (1912–1978), Finnish politician
 Reino Paasilinna (born 1939), Finnish politician
 Reino Poutanen (1928–2007), Finnish rower
 Reino Ragnar Lehto (1898–1966), Finnish politician
 Reino Valkama (1906–1962), Finnish actor

See also
 
 Reno (disambiguation)